Art Edgson (born July 1, 1949) is a former Grey Cup champion defensive back who played for the Montreal Alouettes of the Canadian Football League, winning a Grey Cup Championship in 1974.

External links
 CFLAPEDIA BIO
 FANBASE BIO

Montreal Alouettes players

People from Duncan, British Columbia
Players of Canadian football from British Columbia
Idaho State Bengals football players
1949 births
Living people